"Another Girl, Another Planet" is a song by English rock band the Only Ones. It is the second track on their debut studio album, The Only Ones, released in 1978. The song is the band's most successful and has since been covered by several other performers.

Recording
It was recorded on a 16-track analogue Studer tape machine and an ex-Steve Marriott Helios mixing console at Escape Studios, a residential facility in Egerton, Kent, England, by engineer and producer John Burns, assisted by Jennifer Maidman, and later worked on and mixed at Basing Street Studios by Robert Ash.

Chart performance
The track was not a chart hit upon its initial release in 1978. Its first chart appearance was 7 June 1981at No. 44, for one week, on the New Zealand chart. It was re-released in the UK in January 1992, backed with "Pretty in Pink" by the Psychedelic Furs to promote the compilation album, Sound of the Suburbs, and appeared in the UK Singles Chart for two weeks, peaking at No. 57.

Recognition
AllMusic describes it as "Arguably, the greatest rock single ever recorded".

The song was placed at number 18 in John Peel's all-time Festive Fifty millennium edition. Playing it in 1980's Festive Fifty, he introduced it as an "artful little caprice". In March 2005, Q magazine placed the song at number 83 in its list of the 100 Greatest Guitar Tracks.

The song is widely believed to be about heroin
"A fantastic song with an amazing guitar line," enthused Tim Wheeler of Northern Irish rock band Ash. "It took me a long time to figure out that it's about drugs – not a girl from another planet – and that space travel is a metaphor for being high. It was Peter Perrett's heroin-heavy drawl that eventually gave it away." In an interview in 2015 Perrett declared that the song has been actually inspired by a girl and that it is not about heroin, nevertheless admitting that he always enjoyed "writing ambiguous lyrics that could be taken on two or three different levels".

In popular culture
The song's title was used as the name of a 1992 American independent movie directed by Michael Almereyda, though the song does not appear in the film. It does appear, though, in six films and their soundtracks:  That Summer! (1979), Different for Girls (1996), Me Without You (2001), D.E.B.S. (2004), Paul (2011), and Her Smell (2018).

Cover versions

Blink-182

Blink-182 recorded a cover of this song for the opening track of Travis Barker's MTV reality show Meet the Barkers. It was later released in 2005 as the closing track on their Greatest Hits album.

References

External links
 

1978 singles
1978 songs
The Only Ones songs
Columbia Records singles
Blink-182 songs
Songs containing the I–V-vi-IV progression